Qaleh-ye Hatam (also Romanized as Qal‘eh-ye Ḩātam and Qal‘eh Hātam; also known as Ḩātīm) is a village in Hemmatabad Rural District, in the Central District of Borujerd County, Lorestan Province, Iran. At the 2006 census, its population was 2,486, in 641 families.

References 

Towns and villages in Borujerd County